Palomena is a genus of shield bugs of the family Pentatomidae and tribe Nezarini; species are found in Europe and Asia.

Species
Species within this genus include:
 Palomena angulata (Puton, 1871) 
 Palomena angulosa (Motschulsky, 1861) 
 Palomena assamensis Zheng & Ling, 1989 
 Palomena balakotensis Zaidi & Ahmad, 1991 
 Palomena chapana (Distant, 1921) 
 Palomena formosa Vidal, 1939 
 Palomena hsiaoi Zheng & Ling, 1989 
 Palomena hunanensis Lin & Zhang, 1992 
 Palomena indica Zheng & Ling, 1989 
 Palomena limbata Jakovlev, 1904 
 Palomena mursili Linnavuori, 1984 
 Palomena prasina (Linnaeus, 1761) 
 Palomena reuteri Distant, 1879 
 Palomena rubricornis Scott, 1874 
 Palomena serresi Meunier, 1915 † 
 Palomena similis Zheng & Ling, 1989 
 Palomena spinosa Distant, 1880 
 Palomena tibetana Zheng & Ling, 1989 
 Palomena unicolorella Kirkaldy, 1909 
 Palomena viridissima (Poda, 1761)

References

External links

Pentatomidae genera
Hemiptera of Europe
Nezarini